This Landwind X5 is a compact crossover produced by Chinese automaker Landwind, it debuted during the 2012 Guangzhou Auto Show in China.

Overview
The Landwind X5 was launched on the Chinese car market in January 2013 with prices starting from 99,800 yuan and ends at 115,800 yuan.

Specifications
The Landwind X5 is powered by a 2.0L turbo with 190 hp and 250 nm of torque and mated to an 8-speed automatic with standard front wheel drive and optional four wheel drive.

Facelift
A mid-cycle facelift was conducted later and the facelift was named the Landwind X5 Plus, replacing the regular Landwind X5 in its place.

References

External links

Official website

Landwind vehicles
Compact sport utility vehicles
Front-wheel-drive vehicles
All-wheel-drive vehicles
2010s cars
Cars introduced in 2012
Cars of China